The 2022–23 season is the 109th in the history of Cosenza Calcio and their fifth consecutive season in the second division. The club will participate in Serie B and Coppa Italia. The season covers the period from 1 July 2022 to 30 June 2023.

Players

Out on loan

Pre-season and friendlies

Competitions

Overall record

Serie B

League table

Results summary

Results by round

Matches 
The league fixtures were announced on 15 July 2022.

Coppa Italia

References 

Cosenza Calcio
Cosenza